Cychrus dufouri is a species of ground beetle in the subfamily of Carabinae. It was described by Chaudoir in 1869.

References

dufouri
Beetles described in 1869